The 1960 Diamond "D" Championship, Canadian women's curling championship was an invitational curling tournament held to determine Canada's national women's curling champions that year. It was held on March 25 in Oshawa, Ontario. 

The tournament was a best of three series held between the champion teams from Western and Eastern Canada. Team West, skipped by Joyce McKee of Saskatchewan easily won the series, 2 games to none, over the Eastern Canadian champion Ruth Smith rink of Quebec. 

The event was held as a forerunner of the first official national championship which would be held the following year.

The event was announced in November of 1959, and was sponsored by Dominion Stores Ltd. The winning team was to receive gold brooches with diamonds, while the runner up rink was to receive silver brooches with diamonds. 

The event was held immediately after the Eastern Canadian championship, which was held March 22 to 24.

Results
Game 1 consisted of a 12 end match, while game 2 only consisted of 10 ends.

Game 1

Game 2

Qualifying

Western Canada
The Western Canadian Championship was held from March 14 to 17 at the Victoria Curling Club in Victoria, British Columbia.

Team Saskatchewan, who was skipped by Joyce McKee won the double round robin event with a 5–1 record. It was the eighth and final Western Canadian Women's Championship.

All games during the Western Canadian Championship were scheduled for 12 ends.

Teams
The teams are listed as follows:

Standings

Results
Draw times are listed in Pacific Standard Time (UTC-8:00).

Draw 1
Monday, March 14, 1:30 pm

Draw 2
Monday, March 14, 7:30 pm

Draw 3
Tuesday, March 15, 9:00 am

Draw 4
Wednesday, March 16, 9:00 am

Draw 5
Wednesday, March 16, 7:30 pm

Draw 6
Thursday, March 17, 9:00 am

Eastern Canada
Team Quebec, consisting of Ruth Smith, Shirley Fewster, Margaret Dawson and Lydia Hope of Lacolle won the Eastern Canadian championship held March 22 to 24, just before the national final in Oshawa.   

All games in the Eastern Canadian Championship were scheduled for 10 ends.

Standings

Results

Draw 1
Tuesday, March 22

Draw 2
Tuesday, March 22

Draw 3 
Wednesday, March 23

Draw 4
Wednesday, March 23

Draw 5 
Thursday, March 24

References

1960 in Ontario
Scotties Tournament of Hearts
Diamond D Championship
Sport in Oshawa
Diamond D Championship
Diamond D